The Champs-Élysées Film Festival is a film festival that takes place annually in Paris, France. The festival consists of French and American feature-length films and short films. There are competitive films that may be eligible for several awards, and a group of out-of-competition selections like retrospectives and avant-premieres. Two film industry-targeted events are hosted alongside the Festival: the US in Progress Paris program and the Paris Coproduction Village, the latter co-organized with Les Arcs European Film Festival. Around 25,000 spectators and professionals attend the festival each year, and 60,000 people attended the free-of-charge, digital 2020 screenings.

Though the Champs-Élysées Film Festival is usually held annually in June, the 10th Champs-Élysées Film Festival was held from 14 to 21 September 2021. The latest Champs-Élysées Film Festival was held from 21 to 28 June, making it the 11th edition.

History
The Festival was created by French distributor Sophie Dulac. Its aim is to showcase American independent films, the focus of its main competitive selection, along with offering a wide array of movie premieres, both American and French. Participating movie theaters are located alongside the Avenue des Champs-Élysées in Paris.

2012 edition

The first edition of the Festival was held from June 6 to June 12, with actors Lambert Wilson and Michael Madsen presiding. During the first edition, more than 15,000 people attended, with more than 50 films screened. Besides the Official Selection of American Independent Films, the Festival's main event, three other non-competitive selections were presented: French Galas, American Galas and Oscar Nominated Foreign Language Films. A competitive Official Shorts Selection was also showcased. A tribute to Harvey Weinstein was held to celebrate his career and a retrospective of 11 of his films was shown throughout the week. Three Audience Prizes (Best American Feature-Length Film, Best American Short Film, Best French Short Film) were presented during the Closing Ceremony, held at the Publicis Cinema.

2013 edition

The second edition of the Festival was held from June 12 to June 18, with actor Olivier Martinez presiding. Struck by Lightning, by Brian Daddelly, was screened at the Opening Ceremony, while Shari Springer Berman and Robert Pulcini's Imogene was shown at the Closing Ceremony. Along with its competitive Official Selections for American feature-length films, American Shorts and French Shorts, the Festival presented a wide selection of important American and French movie premieres, a 7-film Brad Pitt retrospective to mark the release of World War Z and The TCM Cinema Essentials, a thirteen-film selection of American and French classics. Three Audience Prizes (Best American Feature-Length Film, Best American Short Film, Best French Short Film) were presented during the Closing Ceremony, held at the Publicis Cinema.

2014 edition

The third edition was held from June 11 to June 17, 2014, with actors Jacqueline Bisset and Bertrand Tavernier as Honorary Presidents and Keanu Reeves, Agnès Varda, Whit Stillman and Mike Figgis as Guests of Honor. More than 120,000 people attended the Festival, with more than 110 films screened. Ronit Elkabetz and Shlomi Elkabetz's Gett: The Trial of Viviane Amsalem was shown at the Closing Ceremony. Along with its competitive Official Selections for American feature-length films, American Shorts and French Shorts, the Festival presented a wide selection of important American and French movie premieres, the TCM Cinema Essentials, a thirteen-film selection of American classics, and the Great French Classics, a five-film selection. Both Honorary Presidents held masterclasses, and the Guests of Honor presented each a selection of their respective filmographies. Three Audience Prizes (Best American Feature-Length Film, Best American Short Film, Best French Short Film), a Bloggers Jury Award (Best American Feature-Length Film) and a Youth Jury Award (Favorite Film in the TCM Cinema Essentials Selection) were presented during the Closing Ceremony, held at the Publicis Cinema. Along with the US in Progress program, a new event targeted at industry professionals was held alongside the Festival: titled Paris Coproduction Village it brought together 12 international feature film projects in development looking for French and European partners, as well as 6 projects from the Cannes Film Festival Cinefondation Residence.

2015 edition

The fourth edition was scheduled to be held from 10 to 16 June 2015.

2016 edition 

The fifth edition of the festival was held from 7 to 14 June 2016. The main juries were Alexandre Aja and Nicole Garcia.

References

External links 
 
 
 

 
Film festivals in Paris
Annual events in Paris
2012 establishments in France
Film festivals established in 2012